The 2005 Le Mans Endurance Series was the second season of ACO's Le Mans Endurance Series.  It is a series for Le Mans prototype and Grand Touring style cars broken into 4 classes: LMP1, LMP2, GT1, and GT2.  It began on 17 April 2005 and ended on 13 November 2005 after 5 rounds.

Schedule

Season results
Overall winner in bold.

Teams Championships
Points are awarded to the top 8 finishers in the order of 10-8-6-5-4-3-2-1.  Teams with multiple entries do not have their cars combined, each entry number is scored separately in the championship.  Cars failing to complete 70% of the winner's distance are not awarded points.

LMP1 Standings

LMP2 Standings

GT1 Standings

† - #51 BMS Scuderia Italia won tie-breaker due to having more race wins.

GT2 Standings

External links
 2005 LMES season review
 World Sports Racing Prototypes - 2005 Le Mans Series season results

 
European Le Mans Series seasons
European Le Mans Series
European Le Mans Series